The canton of Segré-en-Anjou Bleu (before March 2020: canton of Segré) is an administrative division of the Maine-et-Loire department, in western France. Its borders were modified at the French canton reorganisation which came into effect in March 2015. Its seat is in Segré-en-Anjou Bleu.

It consists of the following communes:

Angrie 
Armaillé
Bouillé-Ménard
Bourg-l'Évêque
Candé
Carbay
Challain-la-Potherie
Chazé-sur-Argos
Loiré
Ombrée d'Anjou
Segré-en-Anjou Bleu

References

Cantons of Maine-et-Loire